The Dhirubhai Ambani Solar Park at Dhursar village near Pokhran in the Jaisalmer district of Rajasthan is a 40 megawatt (MWAC) photovoltaic power station, set up in 129 days and commissioned in 2012. It is one of a large number of solar parks expected to be built in a 35,000 km2 area of the Thar Desert that has been reserved for solar power projects.

Speaking at the dedication of the park, the new and renewable energy minister hoped that Rajasthan alone would exceed 22,000 MW by then.

A  solar thermal project at the same location has been synchronised in November, 2014.

References

External links
Resettlement plans

Reliance Group
Photovoltaic power stations in India
Jaisalmer district
2012 establishments in Rajasthan
Solar power stations in Rajasthan
Thar Desert
Energy infrastructure completed in 2012